This is the results breakdown of the 2019 United Kingdom general election.

Vote shares

Results by party

Seats which changed hands 
79 seats changed hands, neglecting any intervening by-elections since the 2017 general election. These are listed at 2019 United Kingdom general election.

The Conservatives gained 54 from Labour, 3 from the Lib Dems and 1 from Speaker. They lost 1 to Labour, 2 to the Lib Dems, and 7 to the SNP, giving them a net gain of 48 seats.

Labour lost the 54 as said but gained one, Putney, in direct reply, and lost 6 to the SNP and lost 1 to Speaker, giving them a net loss of 60 seats.

The SNP gained 7 from the Conservatives, 6 from Labour, and 1 from the Lib Dems, and lost 1 to the Lib Dems, making a SNP net gain of 13 seats.

The Lib Dems gained 3 seats (2 Conservative and 1 SNP) and lost 4 (3 to Conservatives and 1 to SNP) leaving them 1 down.

In Northern Ireland, the SDLP gained 2 seats (from Sinn Fein and DUP), Sinn Fein gained 1 (from DUP), and Alliance gained 1 (formerly independent Unionist).

Defeated MPs

Open seats changing hands

Being 17 of the 79, this list is 21.5% of those which changed hands.

Footnotes

Notes

References 

2019 United Kingdom general election
Election results in the United Kingdom